TN7 or TN-7 may refer to:
 Tennessee's 7th congressional district
 Tennessee State Route 7
 Honda TN7, a pickup truck
 TN7, a postcode district in Wealden, England; see TN postcode area